Screw propulsion may refer to:
 Propeller (marine) propulsion of water vehicles
 Screw-propelled vehicle on land